The 2011 season was the Hawthorn Football Club's 87th season in the Australian Football League and 110th overall.

Playing list changes 
The following lists all player changes between the conclusion of the 2010 season and the beginning of the 2011 season.

Trades

Draft

AFL draft

Pre-season draft

Rookie draft

Retirements and delistings

2011 player squad

Fixture

NAB Cup

Premiership season

Ladder

Finals series

References

External links
 Official website of the Hawthorn Football Club
 Official website of the Australian Football League 

Hawthorn Football Club Season, 2011
Hawthorn Football Club seasons